KHMY (93.1 FM), known as "My 93-1" is a radio station based in Hutchinson, Kansas, United States , broadcasting a Top 40/CHR format. Licensed to Pratt, the station serves the Hutchinson/Wichita area. It is currently owned by Eagle Communications, Inc.  The station has a transmitter located south of Plevna.

History of 93.1 FM
93.1 FM officially signed on the air as KWLS-FM on Feb. 1, 1980. On April 4, 1983, the station changed its call sign to KGLS. In the 1980s it was one of the stations in the "LS Network" of Kansas radio entrepreneur Larry Steckline, whose initials appear at the end of the "KGLS" call sign (a characteristic of most of the stations in the LS Network).

On January 9, 1998, the station changed its call sign to KDGB, and adopted a classic rock format, branded as "Big Dog 93.1." The station then changed to its current call letters of "KHMY" on March 17, 2003.

Programming
On Christmas Day, 2002, at noon, the station flipped to a 1980s-heavy Hot AC format, branded as "My 93-1." The first song played was "Here Is Gone" by The Goo Goo Dolls. The station launched jockless, which lasted until July 7, 2003.

In 2007, KHMY moved away from its emphasis on 1980s music. The slogan "The Best Variety of the 80s, 90s, and Right Now" was dropped and was replaced with "Hutchinson's #1 Hit Music Station." KHMY would continue to be a Top 40 station and a staple in the Hutchinson community over the next 6+ years.

The Eagle Media Center
In April 2007, the studios of My 93-1 moved from Halstead Road on Hutchinson's east side to the new Eagle Media Center in downtown Hutchinson in a building formerly housing Commerce Bank. The Eagle Media Center would also house sister stations KHUT and KWBW.

Air staff

Daren Dunn holds down mornings on My 93-1 and is also the station's program director. Cyndee Campbell holds down middays, Rodney Baker is in afternoons and Matt Stooks does evenings.

References

External links

HMY
Contemporary hit radio stations in the United States
Radio stations established in 1980